The Chairman of the Council of People's Deputies of Kamchatka Oblast was the presiding officer of that legislature 1997-2007. He/she was preceded by The Chairman of the Legislative Assembly of Kamchatka Oblast 1995-1997.

Office-holders

See also 
List of Chairmen of the Legislative Assembly of Kamchatka Krai

Sources 

Lists of legislative speakers in Russia
Politics of Kamchatka Krai